Eocarterus tazekensis is a species of tiger beetle in the genus Eocarterus and subgenus Eocarterus.

References

Eocarterus
Beetles described in 1959